Cold fusion is a hypothesized type of nuclear reaction that would occur at or near room temperature.

Cold fusion may also refer to:

In science
Muon-catalyzed fusion, before Fleischmann and Pons, was sometimes called cold fusion
Pyroelectric fusion, first achieved in 2005, uses a pyroelectric crystal to accelerate ions to fusion energies with room temperature equipment
Polywell fusion, uses inertial electrostatic confinement to attract and confine ions so densely that they fuse
Nuclear fusion where the product nuclei have a relatively low excitation energy of around 10 to 20 MeV (this meaning is used mostly in the field of the synthesis of superheavy elements)

In culture
Cold Fusion (novel), 1996 novel by Lance Parkin, based on the sci-fi TV series Doctor Who
"Cold Fusion" (The Twilight Zone), an episode of the 2002 TV series
Cold Fusion (2001 film), a documentary film about skiing and snowboarding by Warren Miller
Cold Fusion (2011 film), a sci-fi film starring Adrian Paul and William Hope

In computing
Adobe ColdFusion, application server and development framework for computer software
ColdFusion Markup Language, CFML, scripting programming language for the Adobe server

See also
Cold contact (disambiguation)
Cold joint
Cold junction (disambiguation)
Cold welding
Fusion (disambiguation)